Micarea melaeniza is a species of fungus belonging to the family Pilocarpaceae.

It is native to Europe.

References

Pilocarpaceae